Turukhansk Airport  is an airport in Krasnoyarsk Krai, Russia located 2 km west of Turukhansk. It accommodates medium-size airliners.

Airlines and destinations

References
RussianAirFields.com

Airports built in the Soviet Union
Airports in Krasnoyarsk Krai